The 2015–16 season of the FA Women's Premier League is the 24th season of the competition, which began in 1992. Formerly the top flight of women's football in England, this season it sits at the third and fourth levels of the women's football pyramid, below the two divisions of the FA Women's Super League and above the eight regional football leagues.

The league features six regional divisions: the Northern and Southern divisions at level three of the pyramid, and below those Northern Division 1, Midlands Division 1, South East Division 1, and South West Division 1. 72 teams were members of the league at the beginning of the 2015–16 season, divided equally into six divisions of twelve teams. At the end of the season the champions of the Northern and Southern divisions will both qualify for a playoff match against each other which will decide the overall league champion, who subject to meeting league requirements will be promoted to FA WSL 2.

Premier Division

Northern Division

Changes from last season:
League champions Sheffield were promoted to FA WSL 2.
Wolverhampton Wanderers were relegated to Midlands Division One.
Loughborough Foxes and Guiseley Vixens were promoted into the Northern Division from Midlands Division One and Northern Division One respectively.
Copsewood (Coventry) relocated into the Northern Division from the Southern and were renamed Nuneaton Town.
Coventry United moved in the opposite direction, relocating from the North to the Southern Division.

League table

Results

Southern Division

Changes from last season:
Gillingham and Keynsham Town were relegated to South East and South West Division One respectively.
Forest Green Rovers and C & K Basildon were promoted from South West and South East Division One.
Coventry United relocated into the Southern Division from the Northern Division.
Copsewood (Coventry) renamed themselves Nuneaton Town and relocated to the Northern Division.

League table

Results

Championship play-off
The overall FA WPL champion was decided by a play-off match held at Wycombe Wanderers' Adams Park stadium on 29 May 2016, which resulted in a 4–2 victory for Southern Division Brighton & Hove Albion over Northern Division Sporting Club Albion. Brighton won promotion to FA WSL 2 a few days after the match, having met The Football Association's licensing requirements for entry to the Women's Super League.

Division One

Northern Division One

The teams competing this season are:

League table

Midlands Division One

Changes from last season:
 Loughborough Foxes were promoted to the Northern Division.
 Wolverhampton Wanderers were relegated from the Northern Division.
 Birmingham & West Midlands Police were promoted from the West Midlands Regional League and changed their name to Birmingham & West Midlands.
 Peterborough Northern Star were promoted from the East Midlands Regional League.
 Mansfield Town and Curzon Ashton were relegated to the regional leagues.

The teams competing this season are:

League table

South East Division One

Changes from last season:
Gillingham were relegated from the Southern Division.
Lowestoft Town and Old Actonians were promoted from the Eastern Region League and the London & South Eastern League respectively.
C&K Basildon were promoted to the Southern Division.

The teams competing this season are:

League table

South West Division One

Changes from last season:
Forest Green Rovers were promoted to the Southern Division.
Keynsham Town were relegated from the Southern Division.
Maidenhead United were promoted from the Southern Region League.
Gloucester City and Swindon Spitfires were promoted from the South West Region League.

The teams competing this season are:

 Gloucester City and Swindon Spitfires both withdrew from the league during the season. All results involving them were expunged.

League table

Results

References

External links
Official website of the FA Women's Premier League
League results and standings

FA Women's National League seasons
2015–16 in English women's football
2015–16 domestic women's association football leagues